KNNN-LP, VHF analog channel 6, most recently known on-air as Hella Radio 87.7 FM, was a low-powered indie and alternative rock radio and television station licensed to Redding, California, United States. Founded September 16, 2003 by Venture Technologies Group, LLC, the station was last owned by Walker Broadcast Group LLC. The station formerly operated and marketed itself as a radio station using the audio portion of NTSC channel 6 (87.75 MHz) to broadcast audio (most FM radio receivers can receive this frequency at 87.7 on the low end of the FM dial). Although the station no longer airs over the air due to the FCC mandated digital television conversion on low-powered stations, Hella Radio continues to air online.

History
In 2010, it became a country music station, branded "Hank FM", after the original KNNN station (located at 99.3 FM at the time) changed formats to news/talk and its call letters to KQMS-FM. Hella Media Group took over station operations on January 1, 2017 through July 23, 2018. Hella Radio programming was suspended as a result of the Carr Wildfire that struck the Redding, California area although the Hella Radio programming continued to stream online. The station relocated from the former Redding Radio facility on Alta Mesa Drive to the KIXE-TV building on North Market Street. The frequency was sold to Walker Broadcast Group LLC on December 19, 2019.

On July 13, 2021, KNNN-LP signed off permanently as part of the FCC's mandated digital television transition on low powered stations, which also included television stations operating at 87.7 FM. Hella Radio eventually announced that it will continue to operate on the internet while they have plans to eventually find a new frequency.

Effective September 8, 2022, the station's license was cancelled by the FCC due to having been silent for more than 12 months.

References

External links

NNN-FM
NNN-LP
Television channels and stations established in 2003
Defunct television stations in the United States
Television channels and stations disestablished in 2022
2022 disestablishments in California